Scott Turner may refer to:

Scott Turner (American football) (born 1982), American football coach
Scott Turner (Big Brother) (born 1975), contestant in the UK series Big Brother
Scott Turner (engineer), (1880–1972), American mining engineer
Scott Turner (footballer) (born 1970), Australian rules footballer
Scott Turner (rugby league) (born 1988), British rugby league player
Scott Turner (politician) (born 1972), American politician and former football player
Scott Turner (songwriter) (1931–2009), Canadian composer, producer, musician and publisher
J. Scott Turner (born 1951), American physiologist